The  is a professional wrestling tag team championship owned by the Pure-J promotion. The title is named after the Daily Sports newspaper.

Title history

The championship was introduced by the JWP Joshi Puroresu promotion on August 3, 2008, when Harukura (Kayoko Haruyama and Tsubasa Kuragaki) defeated Manami Toyota and Yumiko Hotta in a tournament final to become the inaugural champions. The title was afterwards defended together with the JWP Tag Team Championship, with only one exception. On January 16, 2011, Harukura successfully defended just the Daily Sports Women's Tag Team Championship against Hailey Hatred and Kaori Yoneyama. Together, the two titles were sometimes referred to as the "JWP Double Crown Tag Team Championship". When JWP Joshi Puroresu went out of business in April 2017, the two titles were separated again with the JWP title remaining with the JWP production company, while the Daily Sports title moved on to Command Bolshoi's new follow-up promotion, Pure-J.

Like most professional wrestling championships, the title is won as a result of a scripted match. 

Harukura (Kayoko Haruyama and Tsubasa Kuragaki) were the first champions in the title's history. Command Bolshoi and Leon's ongoing first reign as a team is the longest in the title's history at + days. The reign was the final to take place in JWP Joshi Puroresu and the first in Pure-J. The teams of Azumi Hyuga and Ran Yu-Yu, and Uematsu☆Ran (Ran Yu-Yu and Toshie Uematsu) share the record for the shortest reign, at 14 days. Harukura holds the record most reigns as a team, with three. Command Bolshoi holds the record for most reigns individually, with four. Overall, there have been twenty-nine reigns shared among thirty-one different wrestlers and twenty-four teams. Rydeen Hagane and Saki are the current champions in their first reign as a team. Individually, this is the second reign for Hagane.

Reigns

Combined reigns

By team

By wrestler

See also
JWP Tag Team Championship
Women's World Tag Team Championship

References

External links
JWP's official website

JWP Joshi Puroresu championships
Women's professional wrestling tag team championships